Palencia is a town, with a population of 31,824 (2018 census), and a municipality in the Guatemala department of Guatemala.

References 

Municipalities of the Guatemala Department